Voyagers is a 2021 science fiction film written, co-produced and directed by Neil Burger. It stars Tye Sheridan, Lily-Rose Depp, Fionn Whitehead, Colin Farrell, Chanté Adams, Isaac Hempstead Wright, Viveik Kalra, Archie Renaux,  Archie Madekwe, and Quintessa Swindell, and follows a group of teenage astronauts sent on a multi-generational mission in the year 2063 to colonize a habitable exoplanet amidst runaway climate change and declining habitability on Earth, who descend into paranoia and social conflict after discovering that their personalities and emotions were being artificially suppressed. It has been described as "Lord of the Flies in space". The film was theatrically released on April 9, 2021, by Lionsgate and was a box office bomb, grossing US$4.2 million against a $29 million production budget.

Plot
In 2063, astrophysicists on a climate-change-ravaged Earth find a habitable planet. A scouting mission is sent, although the roughly 86-year flight means that the grandchildren of the launch crew astronauts will be the ones who reach the planet. To help the launch crew cope with the knowledge that their remaining lives will likely be spent mostly in flight, the original 30 are bred through IVF and kept in isolation from the rest of the world. In order to extend their time in flight, they are launched on the Humanitas spaceship as pre-teens, with a single adult, senior program commander Richard (who fought to be included), to guide them through the early part of the journey. To conserve resources, the plan is for IVF to be performed when the crew turns 24, to be repeated on those offspring when they turn 24.

During the tenth year of the flight, Christopher and Zac discover that the grown teenagers are being given a blue chemical in their food to suppress sex drive and pleasure response, keeping them all docile and manageable. The pair stops taking the chemical, and their surging hormones drive them to become competitive, careless, and anxious to engage in sexual relations, specifically with their crew mate Sela, who has been trained to be the chief medical officer.

During a repair effort outside the Humanitas to address a failed Earth communication system, Richard, who has been serving as chief officer, is killed, apparently by an unseen entity, and a fire damages more ship systems. Christopher is voted the new chief officer, which upsets Zac, who then tells the others to stop ingesting the chemical. The mission descends into madness, as many of the young men and women revert to their most primal state.

Zac tells the others that an alien killed Richard, and will protect them, letting them eat all the (closely conserved) food they want. He convinces all but five to follow him rather than Christopher. Christopher and Sela, who have become a couple, find and repair a video disk that reveals Zac killed Richard, precipitating the further systems damage by turning on the electricity to the communications array while Richard was working on it. They show the others, but Zac still convinces many that an alien is inhabiting one of them, leading many to follow Zac in vigilante murders of anyone he targets.

Christopher inadvertently leads Zac to a hidden compartment on the ship, which proves to be weapons for their grandchildren to use on the planet. Christopher, Sela, and Phoebe are the only holdouts. Phoebe is killed, and the pack searches for Christopher and Sela. The pair tricks Zac into being ejected into space, and peace returns to Humanitas. Sela is then voted chief officer. The crew decides to permanently forgo the blue chemical and learn to manage their natural emotions, as well as falling in love and having children naturally, instead of via IVF as had been originally planned.

Decades later, Humanitas and its multi-generational crew arrive at the planet, which appears from orbit to be as earth-like as had been hoped.

Cast

Production
The project was announced in January 2019, with Neil Burger serving as the writer and director of the film. The film was widely described by critics and the staff as being "Lord of the Flies in space".

In April 2019, Colin Farrell, Tye Sheridan, Lily-Rose Depp, and Fionn Whitehead were cast as the film's main characters with filming due to begin in Romania in June. That June, Viveik Kalra, Quintessa Swindell, Archie Madekwe, and Archie Renaux joined the cast as supporting characters, with Lionsgate being chosen as the film's distributor.

Principal photography was to begin in Romania on 17 June 2019.

Release

Theatrical
Voyagers was originally scheduled to be released on November 25, 2020, but its schedule was significantly delayed due to the fallout of the COVID-19 pandemic, which negatively impacted the production of a substantial number of films. It was subsequently rescheduled to be released on April 9, 2021.

Home media
Voyagers was released on DVD, Blu-ray and Ultra HD Blu-ray on June 15, 2021 by Lionsgate Home Entertainment.

Reception

Box office
In United States and Canada, Voyagers was released in 1,972 theatres, earning $500,000 on its first day and $1.4 million over its opening weekend, finishing fifth at the box office. The film dropped by over 43.5%, to $779,317, in its second weekend, finishing sixth.

Critical response
The review aggregator website Rotten Tomatoes reports that 26% of 141 critics gave the film a positive review, with an average rating of 5/10. The website's critical consensus reads, "It has a game cast and a premise ripe with potential, but Voyagers drifts in familiar orbit instead of fully exploring its intriguing themes." Metacritic assigned a weighted average score of 44 out of 100 based on 34 critics, indicating "mixed or average reviews". Audiences polled by CinemaScore gave the film an average grade of "C" on an A+ to F scale, while PostTrak reported that 53% of its audience members gave it a positive score, with just 27% stating that they would certainly recommend it.

References

External links
 

2021 films
2021 science fiction films
2021 thriller films
2020s American films
2020s British films
2020s dystopian films
2020s English-language films
2020s science fiction thriller films
2020s teen films
American dystopian films
American science fiction thriller films
American teen films
British science fiction thriller films
British teen films
Czech science fiction films
Czech thriller films
English-language Czech films
English-language Romanian films
Films directed by Neil Burger
Films postponed due to the COVID-19 pandemic
Films set in the future
Films set in outer space
Films set on spacecraft
Films shot in Romania
Lionsgate films
Romanian science fiction films
Romanian thriller films
Summit Entertainment films
Teen science fiction films
Teen thriller films